The 2014 J.League Division 2 season was the 43rd season of the second-tier club football in Japan and the 16th season since the establishment of J2 League. The season commenced on 2 March and ended on 23 November. Post-season promotion and relegation playoffs will be played until 7 December.

Clubs
Gamba Osaka and Vissel Kobe have stayed in the second division for just a year, winning a promotion as champions and runners-up respectively. Fourth-placed Tokushima Vortis won the promotion playoffs and become the very first Shikoku club to play in the top flight since the establishment of Japan Soccer League, the first amateur nationwide football league in Japan. Shonan Bellmare and Oita Trinita were relegated from the first division immediately after promotion, and Júbilo Iwata have suffered their debut relegation after 20 years in the first division.

On the other end of the table, Kamatamare Sanuki have been promoted from 2013 Japan Football League, replacing Gainare Tottori whom they defeated in the J2–JFL playoffs.

On 29 September the J.League licensing board issued J1 licenses to all J2 clubs except Mito HollyHock, FC Gifu, and Giravanz Kitakyushu. This means these three clubs are not eligible to play in J1 for 2015 season and therefore cannot be promoted directly or via playoffs.

The participating clubs are listed in the following table:

Foreign players

League table

Results

Play-offs

Promotion Playoffs to Division 1
2014 J.League Road To J1 Play-Offs (2014 J1昇格プレーオフ)
Because Giravanz Kitakyushu did not obtain J1 license for 2015 season, they were ineligible to participate in the playoffs. Thus, JEF United Chiba who finished third in the season received a bye into the final.

Semifinal

Final

Montedio Yamagata was promoted to J1 League.

J3 Relegation Playoffs
2014 J2/J3 Play-Offs (2014 J2・J3入れ替え戦)

Kamatamare Sanuki remains in J2 League.Nagano Parceiro remains in J3 League.

Top scorers

Updated to games played on 23 November 2014
Source: J. League data

Attendances

References

J2 League seasons
2
Japan
Japan